José do Nascimento dos Santos (born December 25, 1978 in Luanda), is an Angolan basketball player. Nascimento, a 196 cm (6'4") power forward, has competed for Angola at the 2001 FIBA Africa Championship.

References

1978 births
Living people
Angolan men's basketball players
Power forwards (basketball)
Atlético Sport Aviação basketball players
C.D. Primeiro de Agosto men's basketball players
G.D. Interclube men's basketball players
African Games gold medalists for Angola
African Games medalists in basketball
Competitors at the 2003 All-Africa Games